Mary Doria Russell (born August 19, 1950) is an American novelist.

Early life and education
Russell was born in Elmhurst, Illinois 

She graduated from Glenbard East High School in Lombard, Illinois, which has registered its chapter of the National English Honor Society.

Writing career

Sparrow series 

Russell's first two novels, The Sparrow and its sequel Children of God—sometimes called the Sparrow series or Emilio Sandoz sequence—(Random House Villard in 1996 and 1998) have been called speculative fiction and focused on the religious and psychological implications of first contact with aliens. Both explore the problem of evil (theodicy) and how to reconcile a benevolent, omniscient, all-powerful deity with lives filled with undeserved suffering.

The Sparrow won the Arthur C. Clarke, BSFA, and Tiptree annual science fiction book awards (below), and it was the basis for Russell winning the John W. Campbell Award for Best New Writer in 1998. 

For The Encyclopedia of Science Fiction, chief editor John Clute calls Russell an "author who established a strong reputation for cognitive subtlety and narrative power in her brief [science fiction] career; after the Emilio Sandoz sequence ... she turned her interest to other fields."

Other novels 

The rest of Russell's novels have been categorized as historical novels, although she draws from a variety of genres when telling these stories.

A Thread of Grace (Random House, 2005) is a World War II thriller set in Northern Italy and features both the Italian resistance movement and the plight of Jewish refugees escaping Nazi persecution throughout Europe. Much of story is based on accounts by survivors from the period, when many Italian citizens allowed Jews to seek safe harbor in their farmlands, cities, and ports. (Russell herself is of Italian heritage and is a convert to Judaism.)

Dreamers of the Day (Random House, 2008) is a historical romance set in the Midwestern United States and the Middle East during aftermath of the First World War and the Great Influenza. It focuses on the 1921 Cairo Peace Conference, when Winston Churchill, T. E. Lawrence, Gertrude Bell and a group of British oilmen invented the modern Middle East, thus setting the region up for a hundred years of war.

Doc (Random House 2011) is a murder mystery as well as a realistic and compassionate portrait of the notorious "gambler and gunman" known as Doc Holliday. Doc is set in Dodge City, Kansas, during 1878, the last year that Dr. John Henry Holliday's tuberculosis was in check long enough for him to practice dentistry, a profession at which he excelled. The plot revolves around the mysterious death of a half-black, half-Indian boy who leaves a remarkable void in the life of the city. Doc was the American Library Association's Top Pick in Historical Fiction as well as the Kansas State Library's Notable Novel and the Great Lakes Great Reads pick.

Epitaph (Ecco/HarperCollins, 2015) picks up where Doc left off, following Holliday and the Earp brothers to Tombstone, Arizona, and traces the political and social roots of the infamous Gunfight at the O.K. Corral, as well as the making of the mythology that surrounds it. Epitaph is deeply researched; in addition to thorough study of the history of those involved, the 60-year-old Russell rode 58 miles on horseback through the mountains surrounding Tombstone, retracing the Earp Vendetta Ride.  The novel was called the best ever written on the subject by Earp biographer Allen Barra and was recognized by True West Magazine as the Best Historical Western of 2015. The Ohioana Library Foundation awarded it the Best Fiction Prize of 2016; it also won the Ohioana Readers Choice Award for the year.

The Women of the Copper Country (Atria Books, 2019) is a painstakingly researched novel about the Copper Country strike of 1913–1914, the first unionized strike against all the copper mines in the Copper Country of Michigan's Upper Peninsula. The central character, "Big Annie" Clements, is based on "America's Joan of Arc," Anna Clemenc, who founded the Women's Auxiliary of the Western Federation of Miners and proudly carried the flag in many marches against the Calumet and Hecla Mining Company. Other historical figures, including James MacNaughton, General Manager of Calumet and Hecla, Woodbridge N. Ferris, governor of Michigan during the strike, and Mother Jones, prominent activist and union organizer, are also elaborately and credibly portrayed. The book received a Michigan Notable Book Award for 2020 from the Library of Michigan.

Russell is active on the lecture circuit, speaking at colleges, universities and libraries.

Books
 The Sparrow (Villard, 1996; Ballantine, 1997)
 Children of God (Villard, 1998; Ballantine, 1999)
 A Thread of Grace (Random House, 2005; Ballantine, 2006)
 Dreamers of the Day (Random House, 2008; Ballantine 2009)
 Doc (Random House 2011; Ballantine, 2012)
 Epitaph: A Novel of the O.K. Corral (Ecco/HarperCollins, 2015 hc, 2016 tradepaper)
 The Women of the Copper Country: A Novel (Atria Books, 2019 hc, 2020 tradepaper)

Awards
 James Tiptree, Jr. Award, 1997, The Sparrow
 British Science Fiction Association (BSFA) Best Novel Award, 1998, The Sparrow (UK edition: Transworld Publishers Black Swan, 1997)
 Arthur C. Clarke Award, 1998, The Sparrow
 John W. Campbell Award for Best New Writer, 1998, citing The Sparrow
 Gaylactic Spectrum Hall of Fame Award, 2001, The Sparrow and Children of God
 Kurd Lasswitz Preis (Germany), best foreign novel, 2001, The Sparrow

References

External links
 
 
 Radio interview of Mary Doria Russell discussing Dreamers of the Day and more, with Richard Wolinsky on KPFA's Cover to Cover (April 10, 2008)
 Public radio interview of Mary Doria Russell and NPR book reviewer Alan Cheuse discussing historical fiction. 
 WorldCat Identities Page
 
 

20th-century American novelists
21st-century American novelists
American paleoanthropologists
American historical novelists
American science fiction writers
American women novelists
Former Roman Catholics
John W. Campbell Award for Best New Writer winners
Converts to Judaism from atheism or agnosticism
Writers from Chicago
1950 births
Living people
American writers of Italian descent
Jewish American novelists
People from Lyndhurst, Ohio
University of Michigan alumni
Women science fiction and fantasy writers
20th-century American women writers
21st-century American women writers
Women historical novelists
Novelists from Illinois
21st-century American Jews